Rexdale Women's Centre is an independent, non-profit, voluntary agency that serves high-need women and their families, residing in the Greater Toronto Area of Canada.

Mission 
Their mission is to "support immigrant, newcomer and refugee women, and their family members of all generations to become fully participating members of Canadian Society who are self-sufficient, financially secure, safe, happy, healthy and socially active." They accomplish this by "enhancing our client's individual functioning skills and by facilitating their access to resources, agencies, and community services."

History 
The Rexdale Women's Centre was founded in 1978 by a group of immigrant women, working and living in the Rexdale region in the former city of Etobicoke. Operating at first under the name The Rexdale Immigrant Women’s Project, the organization focused primarily on issues relating to the isolation experienced by immigrant women. Initially, they facilitated self-help groups for women of similar ethnic backgrounds. Over the years, Rexdale Women’s Centre has expanded its programs and services, guided by the mandate to improve the lives of women and their family members within the community.

Partner and Sponsors 
In 1989, the RWC became a United Way of Toronto member agency and works collaboratively to improve the lives of residents. RWC is supported by a number of government agencies, including federal, provincial and municipal governments as well as foundations, private individuals and corporate sponsors.

Furthermore, one of the guiding principles of the organization is to work in partnership.  Since its inception, the Rexdale Women’s Centre has built multi-sectoral partnerships that promote improved access to services for clients.  These partnerships include settlement services, crisis intervention and assistance to victims of violence, seniors and children’s services, and recently coordinating the North Etobicoke Local Immigrant Partnership (LIP).

In the News 
In 2008, Diane Finley, the Minister of Citizenship and Immigration, granted funding to the Rexdale Women’s Centre’s Settlement  and Integration Services. Notably, when presenting the funding Minister Finley defined the importance of such programs as those offered by the RWC:  “Our government believes in immigration and is committed to helping newcomers and their families succeed… Settlement services give newcomers the help they need to learn one of our official languages, find a job and settle into the community. Their successful integration is good for Rexdale and good for Canada.”

In April 2011, Rexdale Women’s Centre was chosen as one out of six Toronto organizations to receive provincial funding for a public education campaign. The campaign aimed to raise awareness towards domestic violence and abuse among new Canadians.  Laurel Broten, the Minister Responsible for Women’s Issues, announced at a press conference that the government awarded $50,000 to RWC to reach out to immigrant and refugee communities to disseminate information about the prevention of violence against women.

Fatima Filippi, RWC’s executive director, noted that in the past year the centre has “helped more than 500 women who were experiencing domestic violence- assisting them to become better informed about spousal abuse, helping them develop safety plans and most importantly, assisting women to leave their  abusive relationships.”

Languages Offered 
Rexdale Women’s Centre offers services in 20 languages:

Arabic, Assyrian, Bosnian, Croatian, Dari, English, Persian, French (upon request), Gujarati, Hindi, Mandarin, Pashto, Punjabi, Serbian, Spanish, Somali, Tamil, Twi, Urdu, West Indian Dialect

References

External links 
 Official website

Non-profit organizations based in Toronto
Etobicoke
1973 establishments in Ontario
Women's organizations based in Canada
Women in Ontario